Charles Butler House may refer to:

in the United States
Charles Butler House (Childersburg, Alabama), listed on the National Register of Historic Places in Talladega County, Alabama
 Charles Butler House (Franklin, Ohio), listed on the NRHP in Warren County, Ohio